Tam o' Shanter is a 1790 poem by Robert Burns.

Including variant spellings Tam O'Shanter or tam o' shanter,  it may also refer to:

Places

Australia 
Tam O'Shanter, Queensland, a locality in the Cassowary Coast Region, Queensland
Tam O'Shanter Point, a headland in Queensland
Tam O'Shanter Belt, South Australia, a historic suburb of Adelaide, South Australia

Canada 
Tam O'Shanter – Sullivan, a neighbourhood in the district of Scarborough of Toronto, Ontario

United States 
Tam O'Shanter Golf Course, in Niles, Illinois
 Tam O'Shanter Park, a city park in Kelso, Washington
Sylvania Tam-O-Shanter, an ice rink and athletics complex in Sylvania, Ohio

Other 
Tam O'Shanter (ship), a barque (1829–1837)
Tam o' shanter (cap), a Scottish hat
Tam O'Shanter Overture, an orchestral overture written by English composer Malcolm Arnold
Tam O' Shanter Inn, a 100-year-old Scottish-themed restaurant in Los Angeles, California
Tam O'Shanter solitaire, a variation of the Auld Lang Syne solitaire card game